The 2020–21 LSU Tigers basketball team represented Louisiana State University during the 2020–21 NCAA Division I men's basketball season. The team's head coach was Will Wade, in his fourth season at LSU. They played their home games at the Pete Maravich Assembly Center in Baton Rouge, Louisiana, as a member of the Southeastern Conference. They finished the season 19-10, 11-6 in SEC Play to finish in 3rd place. They defeated Ole Miss and Arkansas to advance to the championship game of the SEC tournament where they lost to Alabama. They received an at-large bid to the NCAA tournament where they defeated St. Bonaventure in the First Round before losing in the Second Round to Michigan.

Previous season
The Tigers finished the season 21–10, 12–6 in SEC play to finish in a tie for second place. They were set to be the No. 3 seed in the SEC Tournament with a bye to the quarterfinals. However, the SEC Tournament and all other postseason tournaments were cancelled amid the COVID-19 pandemic.

Offseason

Departures

Incoming transfers

2020 recruiting class

Preseason

SEC media poll
The SEC media poll was released on November 13, 2020.

Preseason All-SEC teams
The Tigers had two players selected to the preseason all-SEC teams.

First Team

Trendon Watford 

Second Team

Javonte Smart

Roster

Schedule and results

|-
!colspan=12 style=|Regular season

|-
!colspan=12 style=| SEC Tournament

|-
!colspan=12 style=| NCAA tournament

Schedule Source

Rankings 

*AP does not release post-NCAA Tournament rankings^Coaches did not release a Week 2 poll

References

LSU Tigers basketball seasons
LSU
LSU
LSU
LSU